Events in the year 1993 in Brazil.

Incumbents

Federal government
 President: Itamar Franco
 Vice President: vacant

Governors 
 Acre: vacant
 Alagoas: Geraldo Bulhões
 Amapa: Annibal Barcellos 
 Amazonas: Gilberto Mestrinho
 Bahia: Antônio Carlos Magalhães
 Ceará: Ciro Gomes
 Espírito Santo: Albuíno Cunha de Azeredo 
 Goiás: Iris Rezende
 Maranhão: Edison Lobão 
 Mato Grosso: Jaime Campos
 Mato Grosso do Sul: Pedro Pedrossian 
 Minas Gerais: Hélio Garcia 
 Pará: Jader Barbalho 
 Paraíba: Ronaldo Cunha Lima 
 Paraná: Roberto Requião de Mello e Silva 
 Pernambuco: Joaquim Francisco Cavalcanti  
 Piauí: Freitas Neto 
 Rio de Janeiro: Leonel Brizola 
 Rio Grande do Norte: José Agripino Maia 
 Rio Grande do Sul: Alceu de Deus Collares
 Rondônia: Oswaldo Piana Filho
 Roraima: Ottomar de Sousa Pinto 
 Santa Catarina: Vilson Kleinübing 
 São Paulo: Luís Antônio Fleury Filho 
 Sergipe: João Alves Filho 
 Tocantins: Moisés Nogueira Avelino

Vice governors
 Acre: vacant
 Alagoas: Francisco Roberto Holanda de Melo
 Amapá: Ronaldo Pinheiro Borges 
 Amazonas: Francisco Garcia Rodrigues 
 Bahia: Paulo Souto 
 Ceará: Lúcio Gonçalo de Alcântara 
 Espírito Santo: Adelson Antônio Salvador 
 Goiás: Luís Alberto Maguito Vilela 
 Maranhão: José de Ribamar Fiquene 
 Mato Grosso: Osvaldo Roberto Sobrinho
 Mato Grosso do Sul: Ary Rigo 
 Minas Gerais: Arlindo Porto Neto 
 Pará: Carlos José Oliveira Santos 
 Paraíba: Cícero Lucena Filho 
 Paraná: Mario Pereira 
 Pernambuco: Carlos Roberto Guerra Fontes 
 Piauí: Guilherme Cavalcante de Melo 
 Rio de Janeiro: Nilo Batista
 Rio Grande do Norte: Vivaldo Costa 
 Rio Grande do Sul: João Gilberto Lucas Coelho 
 Rondônia: Assis Canuto 
 Roraima: Antônio Airton Oliveira Dias 
 Santa Catarina: Antônio Carlos Konder Reis 
 São Paulo: Aloysio Nunes 
 Sergipe: José Carlos Mesquita Teixeira 
 Tocantins: Paulo Sidnei Antunes

Events

April 
April 21: Eight years after democracy is restored in the country, Brazil holds a constitutional referendum about what form of government and regime the country would go on with. Voters could choose between a republican or monarchic government, and between a presidential or parliamentary regime. The result was 86.6% of votes in favour of a republic and 69.2% in favour of presidentialism, leaving the country's form of government, a presidential republic, unchanged.

August 
August 1: The cruzeiro real becomes the national currency of Brazil, replacing the cruzeiro at a rate of 1000 to 1.

Births
 January 4 – Manu Gavassi, singer, songwriter, actress, directress and writer 
 February 12 – Rafinha, footballer
 March 24 – Gustavo Henrique, footballer
 March 30 – Anitta, singer and dancer
 April 13 – Letícia Bufoni, street skateboarder
 April 15 – Felipe Anderson, footballer
 April 30 – Henry Zaga, actor
 June 27
 Adair Cardoso, singer and composer
 Camila Queiroz, actress
 October 23 – Fabinho, footballer
 November 14 – Tabata Amaral, political scientist, education activist and politician
 December 16 – Thiago Braz da Silva, Olympic athlete

Deaths 
 January 13 – Camargo Guarnieri, Brazilian composer (b. 1907)

See also 
1993 in Brazilian football
1993 in Brazilian television

References 

 
1990s in Brazil
Years of the 20th century in Brazil
Brazil
Brazil